Bendalgatti is a village in Dharwad district of Karnataka, India.

Demographics
As of the 2011 Census of India there were 299 households in Bendalgatti and a total population of 1,519 consisting of 782 males and 737 females. There were 214 children ages 0-6.

References

Villages in Dharwad district